Millennium Park is a 100 acre urban park in the West Roxbury neighborhood of Boston, Massachusetts.

History 
The park began as the Gardner Street Landfill for the city of Boston. Construction began in 1994 to reclaim the area as a park using land excavated in the Big Dig, and it was officially opened on December 7, 2000 by then Mayor Tom Menino.

Activities and Amenities 
The park is well connected to neighboring parks and trails. It is adjacent to the Brook Farm Historical site and the Upper Charles River Reservation, and is close to the VFW Parkway. It contains conservation land, 25 acres of sports fields, children's play areas, and a canoe launch on the Charles River.

Image gallery

See also 

 List of parks in Boston

References 

Parks in Boston
Parks in Massachusetts